Kaun Banega Crorepati (also simply known as KBC) is an Indian Hindi-language television game show. It is the official Hindi adaptation of the Who Wants to Be a Millionaire? franchise. It has been presented by actor Amitabh Bachchan since its inception, except for during the third season, which was presented by actor Shah Rukh Khan. The programme aired on Star Plus for its first three seasons from 2000 to 2007, and was commissioned by the programming team of Sameer Nair. Since 2010, it has been airing on Sony Entertainment Television and was produced by BIG Synergy (under various names over periods of time) from season 1 till season 10. Afterwards, the credited production companies co-producing are Studio NEXT since season 10 and Tree of Knowledge (Digi TOK) since season 11, respectively.

The format is similar to other shows in the Who Wants to Be a Millionaire? franchise: contestants are asked multiple choice questions and must select the correct answer from four possible choices, and are provided with lifelines that may be used if they are uncertain. Starting in season 7 in 2013, the top prize was ₹7 crore/- ( rupees) and it was increased to ₹7.5 crore/- in Season 14 in 2022 to celebrate 75 years of India's Independence.

Season overview

Season 1: 2000–2001
KBC premiered on 3 July 2000 and was hosted by Amitabh Bachchan, his first appearance on Indian television. KBC initially offered contestants the chance to win Rs. 1 Crore/- (ten million rupees) . The declining ratings of KBC paved way for reformatting the series immediately as Junior KBC with kids as contestants which started airing from 6 May 2001. The season ended on 31 December 2001. The show was well received in its premiere season.

Season 2: 2005–2006
On 5 August 2005, the show was restarted after a four-year hiatus, and renamed Kaun Banega Crorepati Dwitiya or KBC 2. During this season, the top prize amount was doubled to Rs. 2 Crore/- (twenty million rupees). It was abruptly ended by STAR Plus after Amitabh Bachchan fell ill in 2006 after he shot his last episode on 13 January 2006. Bachchan had shot 61 of the 85 scheduled episodes when he fell ill. He announced he would return after he recovered, but when his health prevented him from filming the remaining 24 episodes, Star TV took the decision to stop production.

Season 3: 2007
Star Television recruited Shah Rukh Khan to host the third season of the show when Bachchan declined. The grand prize remained Rs. 2 Crore/- (twenty million rupees). The third season of the show began airing on 22 January 2007 with the first contestant as Prasenjit Sarkar who was the last contestant dropped from season two midway owing to Bachchan's health. The show started well but the show's ratings dropped significantly due to the change of the host. The season ended on 19 April 2007 with a special finale.

Season 4: 2010
The show was restarted after a three-year and half hiatus. The fourth season (called KBC 4) was hosted by the returning Amitabh Bachchan and started on 11 October 2010. This season was telecast four days a week, Monday through Thursday evenings. The tagline of the season was "Koi Bhi Sawaal Chota Nahi Hota" (literally: No question is small). The show moved from STAR Plus to Sony TV. The new logo designed for the fourth season incorporated the new Indian Rupee symbol, which was unveiled earlier in the year. The contestant tryout for the fourth season opened on 2 August 2010 at 9 PM IST.  The total prize money for this season was ₹1 Crore/- (ten million rupees), and a jackpot question for ₹5 Crore/- (50 million rupees). The fourth season of the show was highly successful due to the return of former host Amitabh Bachchan. The season ended on 9 December 2010.

During this season, much like its international counterparts, there were various rule changes made to the show. The number of questions was reduced from 15 to 13 and, as in the United States version of the show, a timer was added to each question. There was a 30-second time limit for questions 1 and 2, and a 45-second time limit for questions 3 to 7. Questions 8 to 13 were not timed. Any time not used was voided and not banked (unlike the United States version which banked the time for the final question). Much like other countries' version of the game, the clock stops whenever a lifeline is used and if the time limit expired, the contestant was forced to walk away with their current winnings. This season introduced the "Double Dip" and "Ask the Expert" lifelines (similar to the United States counterpart from the Millionaire clock format). Also from this season onwards, Fastest Finger First Contestants earlier who used to come for one episode has now been allowed to stay for one week.

Hot Seat 
This Hot Seat version was started at the Diwali time from 1 to 4 November 2010. All contestants were celebrities on this version. This version was just like Millionaire Hot Seat. For questions 1–5, 30 seconds were available. For questions 6–10, 45 seconds were available. For questions 11–15, 60 seconds were available. It had only one lifeline, named Pass.

Season 5: 2011

Amitabh Bachchan returned to host the fifth season which premiered on 15 August 2011 on Indian Independence Day and ended on 17 November 2011. It was again aired four days a week. Compared to the previous season, there was only one major gameplay change: there was only a single milestone (the Padao) that the contestant chose. The tagline used for the season was "Koi Bhi Insaan Chota Nahi Hota" ( Literally: No person is inferior). This season was generally viewed as the most popular show on Indian television in 2011.

This season introduced a play at home segment called "Ghar Baithe Jeeto Jackpot". This contest allowed home viewers to send an answer to a question via SMS during the show, with 1 Lakh Rupees going to the randomly picked winner, who can double or triple this amount by correctly answering further questions.

Season 6: 2012–2013
The registration (contestant tryout) for the season started on 28 May 2012. This sixth season (labeled as KBC 6) was also hosted by Amitabh Bachchan and premiered on 7 September 2012. It aired from Friday to Sunday evenings on Sony TV. The season ended on 26 January 2013. The tagline used for the season was "Sirf Gyaan Hi Aapko Aapka Haq Dilata Hai" It is only knowledge that gives you your right). This season retained the 13 question format of the previous season.

This season, KBC started a new tradition of giving an advantage to socially excluded people, known as "Dusra Mauka". Sonali Mukherjee, a victim of acid throwing, appeared along Lara Dutta in the first such special. On 13 January 2013, another special aired in which Manoj Kumar, a Mahadalit was accompanied by Indian actor Manoj Bajpayee. The winner of season 6 was Sunmeet Kaur.

Season 7: 2013
The rehearsals for the show began on 26 June 2013. Registration started from 8:30 PM on 27 May 2013.

The seventh season (called KBC 7) was also hosted by Bachchan entitled "Seekhna Bandh Toh Jeetna Bandh" ( or simply: Learn to Win) was used as the tagline for the season.  The total prize money was increased to 7 Crore/- (70 million rupees), and the number of questions increased from 13 to 15. The season was commenced on 6 September 2013.

The season had a few changes, including a new lifeline called Power Paplu. This lifeline allowed the contestant to reuse a lifeline that was previously used on another question. (It could not be a lifeline that was used on the current question. For example, a contestant could not use "Ask the Audience"/"Audience Poll" twice on the same question.) Double Dip and Ask The Expert were discontinued and in lieu of 50:50 and Flip The Question (also known as "Switch" or "Switch The Question") were revived. The Phone-a-Friend was extended to 45 seconds. The prize for the jackpot question was increased to 7 Crore/- (70 million rupees). The Kaun Banega Crorepati 2013 set was a 360-degree multimedia stage. The final four questions were a part of Sapta Koti Sandook that let contestants win from 1 Crore (ten million rupees), 3 Crore/- (thirty million rupees), 5 Crore/- (50 million rupees) and finally 7 Crore/- (70 million rupees). The system of Fastest Finger First was also altered. Instead of playing one question, the winner of the leader board formed at the end of three questions sits on the Hot Seat. (i.e. the player who answered the most questions correctly in the shortest amount of time).

Season 8: 2014
The highest winning prize of this season was also 7 Crore/- (70 million rupees). The registrations of KBC 8 were commenced on 22 July 2014 and the shooting started on 2 August 2014. Shooting of some episodes was held in Raipur and other in Surat. This was the first time that KBC was shot outside Mumbai. The format underwent minor changes for the season, with the number of questions reduced to 14, the Double Dip replacing the 50:50, as well as the Flip being replaced by the Triguni (Three Wise Men) lifeline. The Phone-a-Friend was shortened down to 30 seconds and the original Fastest Finger First system (as used for seasons 1 to 6) was reinstated.

The grand premiere episode of the series premiered on 17 August 2014 (Sunday) at 8:30 PM IST for 3 hours. The season aired from Monday through Thursday evenings. Initially running for 1.5 hours, the program reduced to an hour. The season ended on 6 November 2014 and aired its two grand finale episodes on 9 November and on 16 November 2014. The tagline for the season was "Yahan Sirf Paise Nahi, Dil Bhi Jeete Jate Hain". Special guests appeared in the grand premiere episode: television comedian, Kapil Sharma from Colors TV's television series Comedy Nights with Kapil; Shivaji Satam, Dayanand Shetty and Aditya Shrivastava from Sony TV's television series CID; and finally Rajput hero, Maharana Pratap a.k.a. Faisal Khan from Sony TV's television series Bharat Ka Veer Putra – Maharana Pratap gave a stellar dance performance. Among others the Shillong Chamber Choir led by Neil Nongkynrih performed a medley of evergreen songs of Bollywood followed by a patriotic song at the opening ceremony of KBC8.

Season 9: 2017
After a gap of 3 years, KBC returned to the air with Bachchan resuming hosting duties as it premiered on 28 August 2017 airing on Sony TV. The tagline of this season was "Jawaab dene ka Waqt aa Gaya Hai". The show aired from Monday to Friday at 9:00 pm and the Friday episode has been titled as Nayi Chaah Nayi Raah . The season introduced a 16 question format, where the first 10 questions are timed (45 seconds for the first five questions and 60 seconds for the following five questions). The 50:50 lifeline replaced Double Dip and the Three Wise Men lifeline was replaced by the Plus One (from the United States version). Phone-a-Friend (now sponsored by Jio) introduced video calls. In case the contestant reaches the 16th question (Jio Jackpot Question), then the contestant cannot use the remaining lifelines. The last episode of the show was aired on 7 November 2017 titled as Abhinandan Aabhar.

Season 10: 2018
The show started registration on 6 June 2018 and started airing on Sony TV from 3 September 2018. The tagline for the tenth season is Kab Tak Rokoge. In this particular season, the Phone-a-friend lifeline was replaced with the Ask The Expert lifeline.

Season 11: 2019
Season 11 of KBC premiered on Sony TV on 19 August 2019, with Bachchan resuming hosting duties. The show aired on weeknights from 9:00 p.m. to 10:30 pm IST, with Karamveer Special episodes airing every Friday until 11 p.m. IST.
 The show's tagline for the season was "Ade Raho" ( "keep standing"). In this season, the Plus One lifeline was replaced by Switch, with optional categories for the switched question. The final episode of the season aired on 29 November 2019, which featured Sudha Murthy as the Karamveer Special contestant. The series Beyhadh 2 took over KBCs timeslot beginning on 2 December 2019.

Season 12: 2020–2021
On 2 May 2020, Sony TV released a short video via social media featuring Bachchan, stating that the audition process for season 12 will run from 9 to 23 May.

Due to the COVID-19 pandemic, filming and airing was delayed. Filming began on 7 September. Bachchan posted the first look of the updated set on his official Twitter handle.

Season 12 premiere was aired on 28 September, with the tagline "jo bhi ho, har setback ka jawab comeback se do". Aarti Jagtap, a resident of Bhopal, Madhya Pradesh, was the first contestant of the season.

Because of the COVID-19 pandemic, filming occurred without a studio audience. Consequently, the Audience Poll lifeline was replaced by the Video a Friend lifeline, which is similar to the Phone a Friend lifeline, except via video call.

Mrinalini Dubey became the first contestant to win Rs. 25 lakhs/- in KBC 12.

For the first time in KBC history, a contestant (Runa Saha from Kolkata) came to the hot seat without playing Fastest Finger First, as there were no other contestants left.

During a Karamveer episode, Padma Shri Phoolbasan Bai Yadav and Renuka Shahane became the first contestants of the season to win .

On 11 November, Nazia Nasim became the season's first  winner.

On 17th November, Mohita Sharma Garg became the second  winner.

The final episode of the season aired on 22 January 2021.

Season 13: 2021
Registrations for season 13 of the show started from 10 May 2021. The format of digital auditions were continued and entire process was divided into four parts: registration, screening, online audition and personal interview. The show's promos were titled Sammaan and were directed by Nitesh Tiwari. They were released in three parts with the last part revealing the show's air date and time. The show premiered on 28 August, on Sony TV channel and SonyLIV app. The Friday Special Episode was titled as Shaandaar Shukravaar. Studio audience returned for the season and the audience poll lifeline was reinstated. However, the Fastest Finger First was removed and a Triple Test was introduced in which contestants took three general knowledge questions with four options similar to season 7 version, and the contestant answering all three in the shortest time headed to the hot seat. The timer was named "Dhuk-Dhuki ji".

On 31 August, Himani Bundela became the season's first ₹1 crore winner and the first ever blind contestant to win a crore.
 On 21 October, Sahil Aditya Ahirwar became the season's second winner of ₹1 crore. The show completed its 1000th episode on 3 December. The final week of season was titled as Shaandaar Shukriya, and the final episode was aired on 17 December.

Season 14: 2022 
The first episode of Season 14 was premiered on Sunday, 7 August 2022. The "Triple Test" was continued for this season and the lifelines were reduced from 4 to 3. The "expert advice" and "flip the question" lifelines were removed, and video call a friend replaced these lifelines. The number of questions has increased to 17. On account of India's 75th year of independence, the final amount was increased to ₹7.5 crore, an increase of, ₹50 lakhs and a new threshold at ₹75 lakhs was added preventing the player from going down if they misattempted the ₹1 crore question, which is the value of the 16th question and the penultimate question. 

The timer was renamed "DJ Babu". 

Kavita Chawla was the only 1 crore winner. 

Shashwat Goel is the first and only contestant to have attempted the Question 17 worth ₹7.5 Crores. After winning INR 1 crore, he had very logically explained the rationale that if he got it right then it would be an increment of 650% to INR 7.5 crore vs getting it wrong would reduce his prize winnings by 25% only, back down to INR 75,00,000. Goel answered the final question incorrectly and won ₹75,00,000. The final episode aired on 30 December 2022.

Gameplay

Qualification
Similar to the original series in the United Kingdom, members of the public completed a qualification quiz which opened at the start of each series at various times in the year (also known as "registration period"). Applicants would send a premium-rate SMS to a designated number, and answer a question by responding. Contestants would complete a series of interviews before being randomly selected from a pool of other hopeful contestants and appearing on the set in Fastest Finger First. In order to be eligible, contestants must be residents and citizens of India and at least 18 years of age. Even if the contestants are below 18 years of age (only in the junior special episodes), the prize money they will earn will be called points and deposited in their fixed deposit but will be converted to rupees whenever they cross 18 years of age.

Fastest Finger Contest Winner
The selected contestants are then brought to the studio to play Fastest Finger First where they will be asked to arrange four answers into the designated order in the shortest amount of time. In Season 7, contestants would play three questions and the one who answered the most correctly in the shortest amount of time will get selected to sit in the hot seat. In the 13 season, contestants have to answer three questions with four options like the ones in the game. One who has the most correct answers in the least time(added for the three questions) came in the hotseat.

Main gameplay
After determining the winner of Fastest Finger First, they would join the host in the "Hot Seat" to start answering a series of multiple-choice questions on their way to win the top cash prize as outlined in the table below. Along the way, the contestant is free to walk away from the game with their winnings but if they got a question wrong, they would walk away with nothing unless they correctly answered a milestone question (highlighted in yellow) that would guarantee some winnings.

To help them along the way, much like its counterparts, the contestant had a set of lifelines available for them to use. Which lifelines were available were dependent on the format being used.
 Audience Poll (Ask The Audience): The studio audience would dial into a keypad what they believed was the correct answer to the question. The results of the poll are shown to the contestant. It was removed in Season 12 as there was no studio audience due to COVID-19 guidelines. In Season 13, this lifeline was reinstated due to the relaxing of COVID-19 lockdowns across India.
 50:50: The computer would remove two wrong answers from the game, leaving the contestant one right and one wrong answer.
 Phone-A-Friend: The contestant could call a pre-selected friend or family member of their choosing to aid them in answering the question. Once connected, the aiding party and the contestant had 30 seconds (45 in season 7) to talk it out among themselves. In 2017, this became a video call instead of a voice call. For season 10, this lifeline was removed in favor of reinstating Ask the Expert.
 Flip The Question (Switch The Question/Switch): The current question would be thrown out and replaced with a new question. Any lifelines expended on the original question remained expended. It was introduced in season 2, removed after season 3, and reinstated for season 7 and 11. During seasons 2 and 3 it could only be used after the 5th question, while it was available from the beginning in season 7. In season 11, a new question would be from a contestant's pre-selected category out of a given choice of 11 categories. This lifeline has been removed in season 14.
 Double Dip: As featured on the US Super Millionaire, this granted the contestant two chances to answer the question. However, invoking this lifeline removed the ability to walk away from the question. The contestant must answer twice with no further usage of lifelines. (They may use other lifelines before invoking Double Dip but not during the resolution of the lifeline.) In the event of a clocked game, the timer would stop for the first guess only. After that, if the first guess was wrong, the timer resumed counting down. If the contestant did not make their second guess before the time limit or if it was wrong, the contestant would walk away from the game with the lower threshold amount, if any.
 Expert Advice (Ask the Expert): In season 4, the "Expert Advice" lifeline was added to the pool of lifelines available. The producers would invite certain general knowledge experts to come to the studio to aid the contestant. This lifeline was restored for season 10 in 2018. This was discontinued in Season 14.
 Power Paplu: Introduced in the season 7, this lifeline allowed the contestant to reuse a lifeline that was previously used on another question. It could not be a lifeline that was used on the current question. 
 Triguni:  Similar to its US counterpart, the producers would invite certain general knowledge experts or celebrities to come to the studio to aid the contestant. When invoked, the "Three Wise Men" were granted 30 seconds to discuss the question and the possible choices among themselves to come up with a consensus answer to relay back to the contestant who was often in earshot of the conversation. Once the time expired, the "Three Wise Men" were instructed to stop discussing the question, and play resumed as normal.
 Jodidaar: Introduced in 2017, similar to the United States' Plus One lifeline, in addition to having 3 Phone-a-Friends, the contestant can also bring a designated family member or friend in to aid them in answering the question. (This person is designated by the contestant prior to the show.)
 Video A Friend: Introduced in 2020, this replaced the Audience Poll lifeline due to the COVID-19 pandemic, and is essentially a variation of Phone-A-Friend with a new lifeline icon. It functions identically to season 9's Phone-a-Friend lifeline. After being removed in season 13, it has been reinstated in Season 14

Additionally, starting in season 4, the contestant would have to answer these questions within a certain amount of time. Contestants were allotted 30 seconds to respond up to and including the first threshold question (in 2017, this was increased to 45 seconds). The following question up to and including the next threshold contestants were allotted 60 seconds to give their "final answer". For the final set of questions (the question following the second threshold) the questions were not timed. Using a lifeline paused the timer temporarily until it resolved. If the contestant used Flip The Question, the timer would restart from the base value of the question.

The total number of questions available in the game changed. As the number of questions changed, so did the total prize money available. In 2017, KBC introduced a jackpot question. For the Jackpot Question, the contestants were not allowed to use any of the remaining lifelines.

In seasons 5 and 6, the contestants had to select a threshold or "Padao" themselves. They were allowed to choose any one question on the tree and designate that as a threshold amount. Meaning that if they cross the threshold, they were guaranteed that amount of cash winnings. Getting a question wrong before the Padao is reached would result in zero winnings.

Celebrity guests

Season 1

Season 2

Season 3

Season 4

Season 4 Hot Seat

Season 5

Season 6

Season 7

Season 8

Season 9

Season 10

Season 11

Season 13

Season 14
 
Season 15 

 Top prize winners 
 Harshvardhan Navathe (19 October 2000) Harshvardhan Navathe became the first top prize winner of KBC when he won Rs. 1 Crore/- on 19 October 2000.

Vijay Raul and Arundhati (2 May 2001)Vijay Raul and Arundhati appeared in Season 1 and won Rs. 1 Crore/- on 2 May 2001.

Ravi Mohan Saini (14 May 2001)Ravi Mohan Saini appeared on Kaun Banega Crorepati Junior at 14 and won Rs. 1 Crore/- on 14 May 2001.

Sushil Kumar (2 November 2011)

Hailing from Bihar, Sushil Kumar, who appeared in Season 5, is the first KBC contestant to win ₹5 Crores/-. He was a computer instructor in MNREGA earning a meager ₹6,000/- (roughly $121) per month before his entry to.

He has been dubbed as the real "Slumdog Millionaire".

Sunmeet Kaur Sawhney (12 January 2013)Sunmeet Kaur Sawhney appeared in Season 6 and won ₹5 Crores/-. She was the second ₹5 Crore/- winner.

Achin and Sarthak Narula (9 October 2014)Achin and Sarthak Narula''' appeared in Season 8 and won ₹7 Crores/-, making them the first and, as of now, only ₹7 Crore/- winners. They are one of the biggest winners in Asian WWTBAM franchises.

In fiction

Danny Boyle's 2008 film Slumdog Millionaire was loosely based on the show. The movie's host, based loosely on the actual host Amitabh Bachchan, was portrayed by Anil Kapoor. Kapoor himself has appeared on a celebrity version of the show.

Production
Development
After Sameer Nair became the programming head of StarPlus in February 1999, he came across a clip from Who Wants to Be a Millionaire? in July 1999 through Steve Askew, the Australian programming head of the region and got the rights to produce here from ECM who had the Asian version rights. Then, Siddhartha Basu who earlier worked in the show A question of answers was roped to produce the show with his company Synergy communications. The show was then titled Kaun Banega Lakhpati with the maximum price amount decided to be Rs. 1 Lakh/-. In January 2000, Nair had a choice for Amitabh Bachchan to host the show. Rupert Murdoch, chairman of Star TV's parent firm News Corporation, in the next month, ordered to change the maximum amount to Rs. 1 Crore/- and the series was accordingly retitled Kaun Banega Crorepati''. Bachchan who was initially skeptical later agreed to host it. The sets were constructed in Mumbai's Film City in June 2000 and the series was launched in July 2000 during the time when the channel was in a revamp along with conversion into a full Hindi language channel from Bilingual English and Hindi language channel.

Reception

Impact
The series which aired on StarPlus for three seasons is the first show that took the channel's viewership to a greater height, being one of the tops viewed Hindi GEC show in that time.

On 27 April 2007, Delhi High Court on becoming suspicious in the amount won by the actors and VVIPs (Very very important persons) being high unlike ordinary KBC contestants and ordered Monopolies and Restrictive Trade Practices Commission (MRTPC) to investigate into it. However, Star denied it and stated, "KBC-2 is purely a game of skill and not a game of chance; each and every question posed by KBC-2 requires certain ‘thinking’ and ‘exercise of intellect’ to win any sum of money." The case was soon stayed by the Supreme Court.

During the third season, in 2008, Star Plus and the show sponsor Airtel were penalized with Rs. 1 Crore by the National Consumer Commission on violating the Consumer Protection Act when they charged R.2.5 per SMS rather than R.1, earning a huge profit.

In 2010, after the third season, the show was shifted from Star Plus to Sony Entertainment Television who held the format, as the former did not renew their contract.

An FIR was filed against the host Amitabh Bachchan and the channel Sony Entertainment Television for a question asked in the quiz, stating it hurting Hindu religion sentiments, in an episode of season 12 aired on 30 October 2020.

Ratings
The overall average rating of the first season was 14.1 TVR while the second and third got 11.1 and 6.8 TVRs.

The first season started with 22% of viewership garnering 8.96 TVR in the debut week and soon increased to 54% in the last week of July 2000 making it most watched television program and pushing the position of StarPlus to number one for the first time then and also reinvented Bollywood actor Amitabh Bachchan's career. The following seven days it gradually increased and got 9.57, 11, 12.6, 12.4, 12.9, 13.2 and 14.7 TVRs. Maintaining the viewership with around more than 10 TVR until November 2000, it dipped to 8–9 TVR in December 2000 and further to 6–7 TVR in January 2001 while in week ending 3 February 2001 it garnered 7.2 TVR, despite continued to hold its number one position throughout. The highest rating ever achieved by the series in that time was 27.13 TVR during October 2000.

The second season opened with 19.75 TVR in the launch day occupying the top position. In analysis of its viewership in specific regions of India, it had the highest viewership from Madhya Pradesh with 38 TVR during the premiere.

The third season hosted by Shah Rukh Khan received ratings lesser than the previous seasons which were hosted by Amitabh Bachchan and declined through its progress. The season opened with 12.33 TVR on 22 January 2007 with a reach of 23 million while the following days it declined to 10.44 and 7.36 TVRs. On 25 January, it increased to 9.24 TVR however not being able to match like previous seasons of Star Plus. The following week after premiere it improved and got 8.8, 9, 8.4 and 10 TVR from Monday to Thursday.

The fourth season which began airing on Sony Entertainment Television opened with 6.24 TVR while it averaged 5.2 TVR in the debut week and ended with an average rating of about 4 TVR.

The fifth season opened with 5.2 TVR and averaged 4.52 TVR in the week. In week 35, it was at the second position with 5.2 TVR. The highest rating of the season was 7.2 and 8 TVR for the two episodes aired on 1 and 2 November 2011, where contestant Sushil Kumar won ₹5 crores, being the highest rating achieved in last two years by any Hindi GEC. The overall average rating of the series was about 4 TVR.

The first episode of sixth season became the most watched Hindi GEC garnering 6.1 TVR making it the best television launch of the year and garnered 5.3 TVR the following day.

The launch episode of season eight had 8.96 million viewers and that week it averaged 5.2 million viewers.

The ninth season opened with 6.2 million impressions being second most-watched Hindi GEC in urban. Overall, the season was the most-watched Hindi GEC occupying first position for months.

Notes

References

External links
 
 

Who Wants to Be a Millionaire?
2000 Indian television series debuts
StarPlus original programming
2010s Indian television series
Indian reality television series
Indian game shows
Television series by Sony Pictures Television
Indian television series based on British television series